Pomasia parerga is a moth in the family Geometridae. It is found in north-eastern India.

References

Moths described in 1941
Eupitheciini